The Hospitals for the Poor Act 1597 (39 Eliz 1 c 5) was an Act of the Parliament of England. It was enacted during the reign of Elizabeth I and in force until the twentieth century.

The Disabled Soldiers Act 1592 had permitted the bequest of lands and buildings to establish "houses of correction or abiding-houses" for the poor or for maimed soldiers, but as it had not been legally possible to establish a hospital without a specific royal grant, the Act had had limited effect. As such, this Act was enacted, allowing any person wishing to establish a foundation to create it by deed at the High Court of Chancery; such foundations would be permanent. However, a minimum endowment was required, sufficient to produce £10 per annum. The Act, which initially was to take effect for a span of twenty years, was later revived and made perpetual by the Hospitals Act 1623, and then remained in force until the whole Act was repealed by section 39(1) of, and Schedule 5 to, the Charities Act 1960.

References
Select statutes and other constitutional documents illustrative of the reigns of Elizabeth and James I, ed. by G. W. Prothero. Oxford University Press, 1913. Fourth edition.
Chronological table of the statutes; HMSO, London. 1993.

1597 in law
1597 in England
Acts of the Parliament of England (1485–1603)